Events from the year 1992 in art.

Events

16 March - British fashion designer Alexander McQueen shows his first collection, partly inspired by The Silence of the Lambs (film).
12 October – Thyssen-Bornemisza Museum in Madrid is opened to the public as a gallery for the private art collection of the Thyssen-Bornemisza family.
31 October – Kunsthal in Rotterdam, designed by Rem Koolhaas, is opened as a gallery for modern art.

Awards
Archibald Prize: – Bryan Westwood – The Prime Minister (Paul Keating)
Turner Prize: – Grenville Davey

Works

Magdalena Abakanowicz – bronzes
Becalmed Beings
Puellae
Banksy – First graffiti art (in Bristol)
Bust of Bernardo O'Higgins (Houston) (sculpture, Texas)
Muriel Castanis – Ideals (sculpture, Portland, Oregon)
Grenville Davey – Hal
Anya Gallaccio – Red on Green
Gibson/Ashbaugh – Agrippa (a book of the dead)
Damien Hirst – Pharmacy (installation)
Soraida Martinez – Verdadism
Simon Patterson – The Great Bear (lithograph)
George Rickey – Cluster of Four Cubes (sculpture, Washington, D.C.)
James Rosenquist – Time Dust
Brad Rude – A Donkey, 3 Rocks, and a Bird. (sculpture, Portland, Oregon)
George Segal – Street Crossing (sculpture)
Jack Vettriano – The Singing Butler
  Christopher Wool - "If You"

Exhibitions
"Circa 1492: Art in the Age of Exploration" at the National Gallery of Art in Washington D.C.
Edward Delaney retrospective – Royal Hibernian Academy.
Richard Hamilton retrospective – Tate Gallery.
Sol LeWitt Drawings 1958–1992 – Gemeentemuseum Den Haag.
Young British Artists – Saatchi Gallery, London (featuring Damien Hirst's The Physical Impossibility of Death in the Mind of Someone Living).

Gifts (Bequests)
Herbert and Dorothy Vogel collection given to National Gallery of Art in Washington, D.C.

Births
29 January – George Pocheptsov, American painter

Deaths

January to June
6 January – Richard Mortensen, Danish painter and educator (b. 1910)
27 January – Isabel Rawsthorne, English painter and model (b. 1912)
19 February – Lena Gurr, American painter and lithographer (b. 1897).
4 March – Art Babbitt, American animator (b. 1907).
6 March – Maria Helena Vieira da Silva, Portuguese-French abstract painter (b. 1908).
11 April – Alejandro Obregón, Colombian painter, muralist, sculptor and engraver (b. 1920).
28 April – Francis Bacon, Irish-born British figurative painter (b. 1909).
13 May – F. E. McWilliam, Irish sculptor (b. 1909).
6 June – Richard Eurich, English marine painter (b. 1903).
15 June – Brett Whiteley, Australian avant-garde artist (b. 1939).
18 June – Mordecai Ardon, Israeli painter (b. 1896).
28 June – John Piper, English landscape painter and designer (b. 1903).
30 June – André Hébuterne, French painter (b. 1894).
6 July – Richard Eurich, English sea- and landscape painter (b. 1903).

July to December
7 September – EQ Nicholson, English textile designer and painter (b.1908).
25 September – César Manrique, Spanish artist and architect (b. 1919)
30 October – Joan Mitchell, American Abstract Expressionist painter (b. 1925).
11 November – Giulio Carlo Argan, Italian art historian and politician (b. 1909).
27 November – Ivan Generalić, Croatian naïve art painter (b. 1914)
30 November - Bernard Lefebvre, French photographer (b. 1906)
23 December – Vincent Fourcade, French interior designer (b. 1934).
24 December – Peyo, Belgian comics artist (b. 1928).

References

 
Years of the 20th century in art
1990s in art